The 2021–22 season was the 29th played by the Guildford Flames. They were members of the Elite Ice Hockey League. Both the 2019–20 and 2020–21 seasons never took place due to the coronavirus pandemic. It was the fourteenth season under Paul Dixon as head coach.

At the end of May 2021, the Flames revealed that John Dunbar would return four a fourth season. June 2021 it was announced that goaltender Kevin Lindskoug, Defenceman Jake Bolton and Jamal Watson had joined, along with Jordan Cownie and the return of Brett Ferguson for a fourth season.

References

External links
Official Guildford Flames website

Guildford Flames seasons